Bukali II (Bukali, Bukari, Abukari, Abubakar; born 1939 or 1940's), known as Gariba II, is the current Yaa Naa, traditional ruler of the Kingdom of Dagbon in Ghana.

Bukali was born in royalty at Mion to Mahama II, the Yaa Naa from 1938 to 6 February 1948. His mother,  Ayishetu, was a princess from Kulunpke, a small community near Chaazaadaanyili in Northern Ghana. Bukali's first undertook public duties as the chief of Kpunkpono until he was elevated to Savelegu; one of three gate skins to succeed the Yaa Naa. 

Bukali was ordained by the kingmakers of Dagbon as the 41st Yaa Naa on January 18, 2019, following a chieftaincy dispute that left the Yendi skins vacant for 16 years. His election to the Yendi Skin was unanimously made by the King Making Committee and was proudly hailed by all and sundry in the Kingdom including the House of Abudu ,who issued one of the first congratulatory messages to the King.

Early life

Public office

Investiture
The ceremony to outdoor Bukali II began on January 25 throughout 27 of 2019. The preceding two weeks of his investiture was devoted to the celebration of the final funeral rites of Mahamadu IV and Yakubu II; each lasting one week with the former taking the lead. This timeline was determined by the Committee of Eminent Chiefs formed by the Government of Ghana to intervene the dispute that followed the murder of the immediate past Yaa Naa Yakubu II that led to a 17-years long vacancy of the Yendi skins.

On Friday January 18, 2019; the final day of the funeral of Yakubu II, kingmakers of Dagbon led by the Kuga Naa Abdulai Adam II, consulted the Dagbon oracles to select a new king from among four contenders; namely, Yoo Naa Abukari Mahama; chief of Savelugu, Kampakuya Naa Abdulai Yakubu; regent of Yakubu II, Bolin Lana Abdulai Mahamudu; regent of Mahamadu IV, and Tampion Lana Alhassan Andani, chief of Tampion. Grass pulled from the roof of the Gbewaa Palace by the Gushei Naa was handed over to Abukari Mahama by the Kuga Naa. This gesture signified that the oracle had chosen Abukari Mahama to be the Yaa Naa.

The ceremony of the investiture was held at the forecourt of the Gbewaa Palace. Special guest of honor was the president of Ghana, Nana Akufo Addo. Present at the ceremony were Chiefs from Dagbon and their entourage, religious leaders, government officials, politicians and political party representatives including former president John Mahama, and delegations sent by various paramouncies and chiefdoms including Asanteman and Mamprugu. The ceremony was chaired by Togbe Afede XIV, Agbogbomefia of the Asogli State in the Volta Region and President of the National House of Chiefs.

Public perception and character

Ancestry

References

Living people
Dagomba people
Ghanaian leaders
Dagbon royalty
People from Yendi
Yaa Naa
1939 births
History of Ghana
African kings